Isabel Leigh, Lady Stumpe ( 1496 – 16 Feb 1573) was a lady-in-waiting during the reign of her younger half-sister, Catherine Howard, fifth wife and Queen Consort to Henry VIII.

Early life 
Isabel was the first child of Joyce Culpeper and Sir Ralph Leigh. She had two younger sisters and two younger brothers:
Margaret Leigh (born  1500); married a man surnamed Rice.
Joyce Leigh (born  1504); married John Stanney. May have had issue.
John Leigh (born  1502); married Elizabeth, surname unknown. Had issue.
Ralph Leigh (born  1498; died  1561); married Margaret Ireland. Had issue.

Ralph died c. 1509/1510 and Isabel's mother remarried to Lord Edmund Howard c. 1513/1515. They had six children.
Margaret Howard ( 1515 – 10 Oct 1572); married Sir Thomas Arundell of Wardour Castle, son of Sir John Arundell of Lanherne and Lady Eleanor Grey. Had issue.
 Mary Howard (born after 1515); married Edmund Trafford.
 Henry Howard (born after 1515); married Anne Howard.
 Charles Howard (born after 1515).
 George Howard ( 1519 – 1580).
 Catherine Howard ( 1523 – 13 Feb 1542); married Henry VIII of England.

Marriage and issue 
She married Edward Bayntun or Baynton, of Bromham, Wiltshire, on 18 January 1531. They had three children.
Henry Baynton (b. c 1536). Married Anne Cavendish. Had issue.
Francis Baynton (b. 1537)
Anne Baynton (d. young)

After Edward's death in 1544, Isabel married James Stumpe of Malmesbury, Wiltshire. James had been her step-daughter Bridget's husband, and Isabel and James married after Bridget died in 1545. James died in 1563.

Isabel married a Thomas Stafford about 1565.

Royal connections
The leases of many manors such as Paddington, Temple Rockley, and Chisbury were given to Edward during his marriage to Isabel. Some of the leases were given to Isabel after Edward's death, and they passed on to their son Henry. On New Year's Day 1532, Isabel made a gift of a shirt to the King, following a gesture that had first been made by Edward's first wife Elizabeth.

Isabel became one of Catherine Howard's Ladies of the Privy Chamber upon her marriage to Henry VIII. Her husband Edward Baynton was Vice-Chamberlain of the Household to all of Henry VIII's later queens, including Catherine Howard. When Queen Catherine was banished from court in 1541, Isabel was one of the four ladies-in-waiting she was allowed to take with her. An account of the jewels that was taken following the Queen's arrest noted that she had given a "girdle of gold" to the Lady Baynton.

For a short time, Isabel served as a guardian of Mary I of England and Elizabeth I with Edward.

Later life and death
In 1550, Isabel obtained a lease for the dissolved monastery at Edington, Wiltshire with Edward Hastings, 1st Baron Hastings of Loughborough. An interest in the manor of Faulston near Salisbury was declined by Isabel, but after her death in February 1573 the interest was taken up by her son Henry.

References 

1490s births
1573 deaths
English ladies-in-waiting
16th-century English women
Household of Catherine Howard